Uggletorp is a village on the island of Öland. It lies next to the Swedish road 136. It belongs to the municipality of Borgholm.

Populated places in Borgholm Municipality